Anything You Can Do is a Canadian stunt-based game show that aired on that country's CTV network and in syndication in the United States from 1971 to 1974. The host in the show's first season was Gene Wood, who at the time was also the announcer on Beat the Clock. For the last two seasons, Don Harron was the host. Bill Luxton was the announcer for the series, which was taped at the studios of CJOH-TV in Ottawa, Ontario.

The game was billed as a "battle of the sexes" and was played by two teams of three, men against women.

Rules
Two teams of three, men against women, competed. Center stage was a board containing the names of occupations that are (or were, at the time) generally performed by men, and occupations generally performed by women. The men picked from the women's side of the board; the women, from the men's. The object was to complete a stunt related to the chosen occupation in 90 seconds or less. The time required to complete the stunt was added to the times for completing previous stunts; the team with the least total time at the end of the show won and received prizes; the losing team received prizes of lesser value.

There was also a "brain game" about midway through the show; the teams would have to complete some activity such as spelling or unscrambling a word, reciting a tongue twister, etc. The time taken to complete the task was added to the team's overall time.

Schedule
In Canada, the series aired as a daily daytime show as well as a weekly nighttime show. Some U.S. stations aired it daily while others only showed it once a week.

References

David Hammett, "A Conversation With Gene Wood," May 27, 1996.

External links
 

1970s Canadian game shows
First-run syndicated television programs in the United States
1971 Canadian television series debuts
1974 Canadian television series endings
CTV Television Network original programming